R v Généreux, [1992] 1 S.C.R. 259 is a leading Supreme Court of Canada decision where the Court ruled that that the military court martial system must comply with the constitutional requirements for judicial independence under section 11(d) of the Canadian Charter of Rights and Freedoms.

Background

Michel Généreux was a corporal in the Canadian Forces. He was charged with drug possession for the purpose of trafficking in violation of section 4 of the Narcotics Control Act and for desertion in violation of section 88(1) of the National Defence Act.

In the General Court Martial he was convicted for both offences, which was upheld in the Court Martial Appeal Court.

The issue before the Supreme Court was whether the General Court Martial was an independent and impartial tribunal under section 11(d) of the Charter.

Opinion of the Court

The Court examined the requirements for judicial independence established in Valente v. The Queen [1985]. It was found that the judges on the military court did not have sufficient security of tenure or administrative autonomy, which left them vulnerable to interference from the military and government. Consequently, the Court found that the accused's right to an independent and fair tribunal under section 11(d) of the Charter was violated.

Aftermath

The decision brought about many changes to the military courts. The Government of Canada commissioned recently retired Chief Justice Brian Dickson to write a report to recommend changes to the courts which were eventually incorporated into the 1998 National Defence Act.

See also

 List of Supreme Court of Canada cases (Lamer Court)
 Beauregard v Canada
 Mackeigan v Hickman
 Provincial Judges Reference
 Re Therrien
 Provincial Court Judges' Assn of New Brunswick v New Brunswick (Minister of Justice)

External links

 

Canadian Charter of Rights and Freedoms case law
Supreme Court of Canada cases
1992 in Canadian case law
Military justice
Canadian military law
Courts martial of Canada